The 2013 Letran Knights men's basketball team represented Colegio de San Juan de Letran in the 89th season of the National Collegiate Athletic Association in the Philippines. The men's basketball tournament for the school year 2013-14 began on June 22, 2013, and the host school for the season was De La Salle–College of Saint Benilde.

The Knights finished the double round-robin eliminations at second place with 14 wins against 4 losses. The Knights, holding a twice-to-beat advantage against the San Sebastian Stags, defeated them in one game to arrange a best-of-three Finals series against their Season 88 Finals' tormentors and defending champions San Beda Red Lions. However, the Knights lost again to the Red Lions in three games. Raymond Almazan bagged three individuals awards: NCAA Most Valuable Player, NCAA Defensive Player of the Year, and NCAA Mythical Five member.

Roster 

 Depth chart Depth chart

Coaching changes 
Right after a disappointing loss in Season 88 Finals, long-time head coach Louie Alas announced his resignation as mentor for the Knights citing personal reasons. In January 2013, after a proposed deal with former Letran mentor Larry Albano fell through, Letran officials named then-Rain or Shine Elasto Painters assistant coach Caloy Garcia as the new head coach for the Knights. Caloy Garcia was the former head coach of St. Benilde Blazers in 2005–2007. Garcia then brought his own assistant coaches Elvis Tolentino, Ricky Umayam, and Mike Buendia.

Roster changes 
The Knights lost its star player Kevin Alas, foregoing his final year of eligibility, to focus on his duties in the national team. Holdovers were NCAA Defensive player of the Year Raymond Almazan, big man Jonathan Belorio, spitfire Kevin Racal, and diminutive point guard Mark Cruz, who were expected to lead the team. Franz Dysam also returned for his final year. Added to its roster was NCAA Season 87 juniors MVP Rey Nambatac, a product of Letran's high school program.

Franz Dysam shooting incident 
On July 20, 2013, after the Knights game against the Lyceum Pirates, Letran point guard Franz Dysam and his girlfriend Joan Sordan, who were on their way to a victory party in Intramuros, were rushed to a hospital after they were shot by motorcycle-riding gunmen. Sordan's son and two nephews were in the car with the couple. Using a .45 caliber gun, the two gunmen fired several times at the driver's side of the car, killing Sordan and leaving Dysam injured. Dysam tried to shield Sordan from the gunmen and was able to bring her to a hospital, but she was hit in the stomach and was declared dead on arrival. Dysam was in a stable condition after he was transferred to UST Hospital.

NCAA Season 89 games results 

Elimination games were played in a double round-robin format. All games were aired on AksyonTV.

Source: PBA-Online

Awards

References 

Letran Knights basketball team seasons